DTF (acronym for Dans Ta Face, translates into "In Your Face") is a French rap duo consisting of RKM (born Karim Azzouz) and RTI (born Samy Taourirt).

History

Early life and beginnings
Samy and Karim are from the Cité Gagarine district of Ivry-sur-Seine. They started rapping with a few friends from the neighborhood and Karim's cousins: Tarik and Nabil Andrieu brothers, who later formed the PNL. Karim has appeared on PNL's 2015 mixtale, Que la famille and 2015 album, Le Monde Chico.

Formation and breakthrough
Formed in 2015, they made their debut with the release of an extended play (EP) titled Le H avant le B. In 2016, the duo released its first album La hass avant le bonheur, followed by the second, Sans rêve in the next year. In 2017, the duo was selected as one of the opening acts for PNL's six-city tour in France.

In 2019, DTF released its third album On ira où ?, which has peaked at number four in the French albums chart. For the promotion of the album, the duo gave its first television interview to Mouloud Achour's Canal+ show Clique.

Discography

Studio albums

Extended plays

Singles

Other charting songs

References

External links
 DTF at AllMusic
  

French hip hop groups
French rappers